Lodovico Saffiro (died November 1635) was a Roman Catholic prelate who served as Bishop of Squillace (1635).

Biography
On 17 September 1635, Lodovico Saffiro was appointed during the papacy of Pope Urban VIII as Bishop of Squillace. On 21 September 1635, he was consecrated bishop by Giulio Cesare Sacchetti, Cardinal-Priest of Santa Susanna. He served as Bishop of Squillace until his death in November 1635.

References

External links and additional sources
 (for Chronology of Bishops) 
 (for Chronology of Bishops) 

17th-century Italian Roman Catholic bishops
Bishops appointed by Pope Urban VIII
Year of birth unknown
1635 deaths